Apple Computer, Inc. v. Franklin Computer Corp., 714 F.2d 1240 (3d Cir. 1983), was the first time an appellate level court in the United States held that a computer's BIOS could be protected by copyright. As second impact, this ruling clarified that binary code, the machine readable form of software and firmware, was copyrightable too and not only the human-readable source code form of software. 

Franklin Computer Corporation introduced the Franklin Ace 1000, a clone of Apple Computer's Apple II, in 1982. Apple quickly determined that substantial portions of the Franklin ROM and operating system had been copied directly from Apple's versions, and on May 12, 1982, filed suit in the United States District Court for the Eastern District of Pennsylvania. It cited the presence of some of the same embedded strings, such as the name "James Huston" (an Apple programmer), and "Applesoft," on both the Apple and Franklin system disks.

Franklin admitted that it had copied Apple's software but argued that it would have been impractical to independently write its own versions of the software and maintain compatibility, although it said it had written its own version of Apple's copy utility and was working on its own versions of other software. Franklin argued that because Apple's software existed only in machine-readable form, and not in printed form, and because some of the software did not contain copyright notices, it could be freely copied. The Apple II firmware was likened to a machine part whose form was dictated entirely by the requirements of compatibility (that is, an exact copy of Apple's ROM was the only part that would "fit" in an Apple-compatible computer and enable its intended function), and was therefore not copyrightable.

The district court found in favor of Franklin.  However, Apple appealed the ruling to the United States Court of Appeals for the Third Circuit which, in a separate case decided three days after Franklin won at the lower level, had determined that both a program existing only in a written form unreadable to humans (e.g. object code) and one embedded on a ROM were protected by copyright. (See Williams Elec., Inc., v. Artic Int'l, Inc., 685 F.2d 870 (1982)).  The Court of Appeals overturned the district court's ruling in Franklin by applying its holdings in Williams and going further to hold that operating systems were also copyrightable. The Court remanded the case to the District Court for a determination regarding whether Apple's operating system was one of a very limited number of ways to achieve its function. If it was, then Franklin would not be liable for copyright infringement. The parties settled.

Apple was able to force Franklin to withdraw its clones by 1988. The company later brought non-infringing clones to market, but as these models were only partially compatible with the Apple II, and as the Apple II architecture was by this time outdated in any case, they enjoyed little success in the marketplace.

IBM believed that some IBM PC clone makers such as Eagle Computer and Corona Data Systems similarly infringed on its copyright, and after Apple v. Franklin successfully forced them to stop using the BIOS. The Phoenix BIOS in 1984, however, and similar products such as AMI BIOS, permitted computer makers to legally build essentially 100% PC-compatible clones without having to reverse engineer the PC BIOS themselves.

Another impact of the decision was the rise of the shrink-wrap proprietary software commercial business model, where before a source code driven software distribution schema dominated.

See also
Notable litigation of Apple Computer

References

External links
Text of the decision
Another text of the decision

Apple II family
United States copyright case law
Apple Inc. litigation
United States Court of Appeals for the Third Circuit cases
1983 in United States case law
BIOS